Castilleja schizotricha is a species of Indian paintbrush known by the common name splithair Indian paintbrush.

It is endemic to the Klamath Mountains of northwestern California southwestern Oregon. It grows in rocky soils in temperate coniferous forests.

Description
Castilleja schizotricha is a perennial herb and wildflower growing not more than about 15 centimeters tall and coated thickly in light-colored hairs, giving it a gray or white color.

The woolly inflorescence is made up of layers of dusty red or pink bracts. Between the bracts emerge pouched dull reddish flowers.

External links
Jepson Manual Treatment of Castilleja schizotricha
Castilleja schizotricha — UC Photos gallery

schizotricha
Flora of California
Flora of Oregon
Flora of the Klamath Mountains
Endemic flora of the United States
Plants described in 1912
Flora without expected TNC conservation status